Ihor Anatoliyovych Yarmenchuk (born 10 June 1957) is a former Ukrainian association football referee.

In domestic competitions he represented Kyiv. Yarmenchuk started his football referee as an assistant referee in 1988 serving games of the Soviet Second League, Zone 6 (also same as Ukrainian championship) at the game Bukovyna Chernivtsi – Nyva Vinnytsia.

He was a referee at the 2002 FIFA World Cup qualification match between Andorra and Cyprus that took place on 2 September 2000 in Andorra la Vella, Andorra.

References

External links
 
 Ihor Yarmenchuk referee profile at allplayers.in.ua

1957 births
Living people
Sportspeople from Chernivtsi
Soviet football referees
Ukrainian football referees